Mark Edward Leiter (born April 13, 1963) is an American former right-handed pitcher in Major League Baseball who had an 11-year career from  to  and in . Leiter grew up in Toms River, New Jersey.

Leiter graduated from Central Regional High School in 1981, where he played baseball together with his brother Al and Jeff Musselman.

Career
Mark played for the New York Yankees, Detroit Tigers, California Angels and Seattle Mariners, all of the American League. He also played for the San Francisco Giants, Montreal Expos, Philadelphia Phillies and Milwaukee Brewers, all of the National League.

As a member of the Giants, he won the 1994 Willie Mac Award honoring his spirit and leadership.

Personal life

Mark's brother, Al Leiter, was a major-league pitcher from 1987 to 2005, and his son, Mark Leiter Jr., has also pitched in MLB.

Leiter's 9-month-old son Ryan died of spinal muscular atrophy in 1994. He and his wife, Allison, started the Ryan Leiter Fund to raise funds for families of victims of the disease.

References

External links

www.leiteradvantage.com

1963 births
Living people
American expatriate baseball players in Canada
American people of Austrian descent
American people of British descent
American people of Czech descent
Baseball players from New Jersey
California Angels players
Central Regional High School alumni
Connors State Cowboys baseball players
Detroit Tigers players
Hagerstown Suns players
Major League Baseball pitchers
Milwaukee Brewers players
Montreal Expos players
New York Yankees players
Newark Bears players
Philadelphia Phillies players
Ramapo Roadrunners baseball players
San Francisco Giants players
Seattle Mariners players
Sportspeople from Toms River, New Jersey
Sportspeople from Joliet, Illinois
Tacoma Rainiers players